Andrew Willoughby Ninian Bertie (15 May 1929 – 7 February 2008) was Prince and Grand Master of the Sovereign Military Order of Malta from 1988 until his death in 2008. 

On 20 February 2015 a formal inquiry for the cause of his beatification and canonisation was opened in Rome.

Early career
Bertie was born in London as the elder son of Hon. James Bertie (youngest son of the 7th Earl of Abingdon) and Lady Jean Crichton-Stuart (daughter of the 4th Marquess of Bute). 
He was the fifth cousin once removed of Queen Elizabeth II, by common descent from King George III and his wife Charlotte Sophia.

He was educated at the English Roman Catholic public school, Ampleforth College, and graduated in Modern History from Christ Church, Oxford. He also attended the School of Oriental and African Studies of the University of London. From 1948 to 1950, he carried out military service in the Scots Guards, becoming a commissioned officer in 1949. After a short experience in the commercial sector, he taught modern languages (particularly French, and Spanish but also German, Dutch, Tibetan and Maltese) for twenty-three years at Worth School, a Benedictine public school in Sussex, England. He was a judo black belt and taught judo at Worth School.

Order of Malta

Bertie was admitted to the Sovereign Military Order of Malta as a Knight of Honour and Devotion, 14 November 1956. He became a Knight of Obedience 31 March 1968. On 7 February 1975 he entered the novitiate for Knights of Justice and of 28 March 1977 became of Knight of Justice in temporary vows. He made his perpetual vows as a Knight of Justice 20 May 1981.

In 1981 Bertie also joined the government of the Order as a member of the Sovereign Council.  In April 1988, he was elected  Grand Master in succession to the late Fra' Angelo de Mojana. Bertie's election was ratified by Pope John Paul II 11 April 1988.

Subsequently, Bertie was Hospitaller of the Sanctuary of Lourdes, which is the annual pilgrimage site of the Order of Malta.

Bertie described the aims of the Order as "to help the poor and the sick; that is and always has been our primary aim":
"The other military orders were there to fight the Saracens and to save Spain or the Holy Land or Prussia from the pagans. But we always had this special commitment to the poor and the sick. Our aims today are exactly the same as they were in 1099, the sanctification of our members through service to the sick."

Personal life
Bertie never married or had children. He died in Rome from cancer on 7 February 2008, aged 78.

Ancestry

Titles, styles and honours

Titles and style
His full title was: His Most Eminent Highness Fra' Andrew Willoughby Ninian Bertie, Prince and Grand Master of the Sovereign Military Hospitaller Order of St. John of Jerusalem, of Rhodes and of Malta, Most Humble Guardian of the Poor of Jesus Christ.

Honours and awards

Honours
 : Sovereign Military Order of Malta
 Grand Master (1988)
 Knight of Justice (1981)
 Knight of Honour and Obedience (1956)
 : Collar of the Order of the Liberator San Martín
 : Knight Grand Cross with Collar of the National Order of the Southern Cross
 : Collar of the Order of Merit of Chile
 : Grand Cross of the Legion d’Honneur
 : Grand Cross Special Class of the Order of Merit of the Federal Republic of Germany
 : Knight with the Collar of the Order of Pius IX
 
 : Knight Grand Cross with Collar of the Order of Merit of the Italian Republic
 : Grand Cross of the Order of Vytautas the Great
 : Honorary Companion of Honour with Collar of the National Order of Merit
 : Knight Grand Cross of the Order of Saint-Charles
 : Grand Cordon of the Order of the Throne
 : Gold Collar of the Order of Manuel Amador Guerrero
 : Grand Cross of the Order of Merit of the Republic of Poland (10 May 2007)
 : Grand Collar of the Order of Prince Henry
 : Grand Cross of the Order of the Star of Romania
  : Grand Cross (or 1st Class) of the Order of the White Double Cross (1997)
 : Collar of the Order of Isabella the Catholic (21 May 1999)
 : Collar of the Order of the Liberator
 : Collar of the Order of Andrés Bello
  House of Bourbon-Two Sicilies: Bailiff Grand Cross with Collar of the Sacred Military Constantinian Order of Saint George
  House of Bourbon-Two Sicilies: Knight Grand Cross of the Order of Saint Januarius
  House of Habsburg: Knight of the Order of the Golden Fleece (Austrian Branch)
  House of Karadjordjevic: Grand Cross of the Order of the Star of Karageorge
  House of Karadjordjevic: Knight Grand Cross of the Order of the White Eagle
  House of Romanov: Knight of the Order of St. Andrew
  House of Romanov: Knight Grand Cross of the Order of St. Anna
  House of Romanov: Knight Grand Cross of the Order of St. Vladimir
  House of Romanov: Knight Grand Cross of the Order of St. Alexander Nevsky
  House of Romanov: Knight Grand Cross of the Order of St. Stanislaus
  House of Savoy: Knight of the Order of the Most Holy Annunciation
  House of Savoy: Knight Grand Cross of the Order of Saints Maurice and Lazarus
  House of Savoy: Knight Grand Cross of the Order of the Crown of Italy

Awards
 Path to Peace Award (2005)
 Matteo Ricci Award (2006)

Honorary citizenships
 Honorary citizen of Rapallo (1992), Veroli (1993), Lourdes (1999), Magione (2002), Birgu (2003), and Santa Severina (2003). In Bolivia in 2002 he was created Huesped Ilustre of La Paz, El Alto, and Santa Cruz.

Honorary degrees
 Medicine and surgery, University of Bologna (1992)
 Jurisprudence, University of Malta (1993)
 Humanities, University of Santo Domingo (1995)
 Laws, St. John's University, Minnesota (2003)

References

External links

1929 births
2008 deaths
Alumni of Christ Church, Oxford
Alumni of SOAS University of London
People educated at Ampleforth College
Scots Guards officers
Schoolteachers from London
English Roman Catholics
English people of Dutch descent
Schuyler family
English people of Scottish descent
Deaths from cancer in Lazio
Andrew

Princes and Grand Masters of the Sovereign Military Order of Malta
Knights of Malta

Grand Collars of the Order of Prince Henry
Collars of the Order of Isabella the Catholic
Collars of the Order of the Liberator General San Martin
Knights Grand Cross of the Order of Merit of the Italian Republic
Knights Grand Cross of the Order of Saints Maurice and Lazarus
Grand Croix of the Légion d'honneur
Grand Crosses of the Order of Merit of the Republic of Poland
Grand Crosses of the Order of Saint-Charles
Grand Crosses of the Order of the Star of Romania
Grand Crosses of the Order of Vytautas the Great
Knights of the Golden Fleece of Austria
Knights of the Order of Pope Pius IX
Honorary Companions of Honour with Collar of the National Order of Merit (Malta)
Recipients of the Order of St. Anna
Recipients of the Order of St. Vladimir
Recipients of the Grand Star of the Decoration for Services to the Republic of Austria
Servants of God
20th-century venerated Christians
21st-century venerated Christians
Grand Crosses Special Class of the Order of Merit of the Federal Republic of Germany